The 2011–12 Bundesliga was the 49th season of the Bundesliga, Germany's premier football league. The season started on 5 August 2011 with the opening match involving defending champions Borussia Dortmund and ended with the last games on 5 May 2012. The traditional winter break was held between the weekends around 17 December 2011 and 20 January 2012.

The league comprised eighteen teams: The best fifteen teams of the 2010–11 season, the best two teams from the 2010–11 2. Bundesliga and the winners of the relegation play-off between the 16th-placed Bundesliga team and the third-placed 2. Bundesliga team.

Since Germany climbed from fourth to third place in the UEFA association coefficient rankings at the end of the 2010–11 season, the league gained an additional group stage berth for the UEFA Champions League.

Teams
The league comprised eighteen teams: Eintracht Frankfurt and FC St. Pauli were directly relegated after finishing the 2010–11 season in the bottom two places. Frankfurt ended a six-year tenure in the Bundesliga, while St. Pauli only made a cameo one-year appearance in the top flight and directly returned to the second level.

The relegated teams were replaced by Hertha BSC, champions of the 2010–11 2. Bundesliga, and runners-up FC Augsburg. The Bavarian side made their debut at the highest level of football in Germany, while Hertha directly returned to the Bundesliga after just one year at the second tier.

A further place in the league was decided through a two-legged play-off between Borussia Mönchengladbach, the 16th-placed team of the 2010–11 Bundesliga, and VfL Bochum, the third-placed 2. Bundesliga team. Mönchengladbach won the series 2–1 on aggregate and therefore retained its Bundesliga spot.

Stadiums and locations
The most prominent change regarding stadiums occurred at Mainz, where FSV Mainz 05 moved from Stadion am Bruchweg into their newly built Coface Arena. Other changes included the completion of works at Mercedes-Benz Arena, which was converted to a football-only stadium during the 2009–10 and 2010–11 seasons, and the renaming of Impuls Arena, the ground of promoted team FC Augsburg, to SGL Arena effective from the beginning of the season after SGL Carbon acquired the naming rights for the structure in May 2011.

Personnel and kits

In addition to the individual sponsorships of each club listed below, all teams used a league-wide ball named "Torfabrik" (goal factory), provided by Adidas; the ball was updated to a new design for the 2011–12 season.

Notes
 FC Augsburg have determined Paul Verhaegh as new captain, after incumbent Uwe Möhrle was transferred to Energie Cottbus during the 2011–12 winter transfer window.
 Werder Bremen have determined Clemens Fritz as new captain after Per Mertesacker, who was assigned by coach Thomas Schaaf at the beginning of the season, was transferred to Premier League side Arsenal on 31 August 2011.
 VfB Stuttgart have determined Serdar Tasci as new captain after Matthieu Delpierre, who was captain since 1 December 2009, asked, not to be appointed as captain again.

Managerial changes

League table

Results

Relegation play-offs
Hertha BSC as 16th-placed team faced third-placed 2011–12 2. Bundesliga side Fortuna Düsseldorf in a two-legged play-off. Fortuna Düsseldorf won 4–3 on aggregate and thus were promoted for the 2012–13 Bundesliga season. Hertha BSC were relegated to the 2012–13 2. Bundesliga.

Following the second leg, which was marred by several incidents of crowd disturbances, Hertha appealed against the result. On 21 May the DFB Sports Court rejected this appeal, having considered that these crowd disturbances did not psychologically impinge the Hertha players and that the referee's handling of the situation was sound. However, Hertha appealed again, this time to the Federal Court of the German FA. On 25 May, the Federal Court of the German FA also rejected the appeal. On 19 June, Hertha BSC decided not to appeal the decision, marking their immediate return to the 2. Bundesliga.

Season statistics

Top scorers

References

External links

 Official website 
 Bundesliga on DFB page 

Bundesliga seasons
1
Germany